Ansolet Rossouw (born 23 October 1999) is a South African fashion model.

Early life 
Rossouw was born in the Free State to a boer family. She was interested in becoming a teacher.

Career 
Rossouw was discovered on Instagram by a FANJAM Model Management agent. She has walked for brands such as Dolce & Gabbana, Chanel, Elie Saab, Fendi, Miu Miu, Jil Sander, Valentino, Emilio Pucci, Maison Margiela, Off-White, Max Mara, Saint Laurent, Rodarte, and Missoni.

Rossouw is one of the highest paid models in South Africa.

Personal life 
Rossouw permanently lives in New York City.

References 

1999 births
Living people
South African female models
People from Bloemfontein
The Society Management models
Elite Model Management models
South African expatriates in the United States